The Free City of Danzig (French: Ville libre de Dantzig; German: Freie Stadt Danzig; Polish: Wolne Miasto Gdańsk), sometimes referred to as the Republic of Danzig (French: République de Dantzig; German: Republik Danzig), was a semi-independent city-state established by Napoleon on 9 September 1807, during the time of the Napoleonic Wars following the capture of the city in the siege of Danzig in May. After the Congress of Vienna of 1814–1815, Danzig was re-incorporated into the Kingdom of Prussia.

Prussia had acquired the City of Danzig in the course of the Second Partition of Poland in 1793. After the defeat of King Frederick William III of Prussia at the 1806 Battle of Jena–Auerstedt, according to the Franco-Prussian Treaty of Tilsit of 9 July 1807, the territory of the free state was carved out from lands that made up part of the West Prussia province. It consisted of the city of Danzig (now Gdańsk, Poland) along with its rural surroundings on the mouth of Vistula including Oliva, together with the Hel Peninsula and its lighthouse as well as the southern half of the Vistula Spit up to Narmeln.

The Republic was officially proclaimed on 21 July 1807, after the French troops had handed over the city on May 27. Prussia and the Kingdom of Saxony under Frederick Augustus I, also Duke of Warsaw, were appointed guarantee powers. The citizens had to accommodate Napoleon's  forces and to pay large tributes in the preparation of the French invasion of Russia in 1812.

After the French retreat, the Imperial Russian forces laid siege to the city from late January to 29 November 1813, and the remaining  40,000 French soldiers finally withdrew on 2 January 1814.

See also 
 History of Gdańsk
 Free City of Danzig
 Administrations of Danzig before April 1945

1807 establishments in Europe
1814 disestablishments in Europe
City-states
Client states of the Napoleonic Wars
Former republics
History of Gdańsk
States and territories established in 1807
States and territories disestablished in 1814